Lopës is a former municipality in the Gjirokastër County, southern Albania. At the 2015 local government reform it became a subdivision of the municipality Tepelenë. The population at the 2011 census was 723. The municipal unit consists of the villages Sinanaj, Matohasanaj, Dorëz, Dhëmblan and Lab Martalloz.

Etymology 
The etymology of Lopës is in Albanian, as it derives from the word Lopë (Albanian word for cow).

References 

Former municipalities in Gjirokastër County
Administrative units of Tepelenë